"Like Light to the Flies" (or "Like Light", as it is often referred to) is a song by heavy metal band Trivium and is the first single and music video from their 2005 album, Ascendancy. The band originally considered using the song "Ember to Inferno" as their first single but changed their minds after recording this song (along with "Blinding Tears Will Break the Skies" and "The Deceived"). "Like Light" was released in January 2005 and features a mix of screaming and singing. The song contains two guitar solos which are played nearly consecutively to sound as one longer solo; a small interlude is played in the middle of them. The music video features original member Brent Young, and the version of the song used in the video is not the album version but rather the demo version, found previously on the MTV compilation album MTV2 Headbanger's Ball: Volume 2.

Meaning 
"This song is about people's attraction to all forms of tragedy. It seems like everywhere you turn to today (e.g., television, newspaper, magazine, movies, etc.) it's all about murder, violence, war, cruelty- and it's because this is what sells; people are totally captivated by subjects in this vein. We are the flies." - Matt Heafy

Track listing

Personnel 
Matt Heafy – lead vocals, guitars
Corey Beaulieu – guitars, backing vocals
Brent Young – bass, backing vocals (single version)
Paolo Gregoletto – bass, backing vocals (album version)
Travis Smith – drums, percussion

Trivia 
 The video can be found on Roadrunner Records.
 The bassist in the video is Brent Young; Paolo Gregoletto joined the band shortly after its release.
 The song is heard in the 2007 film Smokin' Aces.
 The song is also heard in the video game The Sims 2, in Simlish, and was featured in the 2005 video game Tom Clancy's Rainbow Six: Lockdown.

References

External links
 

Trivium (band) songs
2005 debut singles
2005 songs
Roadrunner Records singles
Songs written by Corey Beaulieu
Music videos directed by Dale Resteghini